Taco Mesdag (Groningen, 21 September 1829Den Haag, 4 August 1902) was a Dutch banker and painter.

Mesdag, son of the banker Klaas Mesdag  and Johanna Willemina, worked with his younger brother Henry in the banking business of his family. Like his brother Hendrik Mesdag, he eventually also chose to paint as a profession. Together they played an important part in the Hague School Pulchri Studio, where Hendrik served as president and Taco as treasurer.

He was taught by Paul Gabriël, among others. Mesdag is best known as the painter of the landscape of Drenthe. Much of his work was donated by his widow, Geesje Mesdag-van Calcar, to the Groninger Museum.

On the Internet, many of his works are displayed in the Webmuseum Mesdagvancalcar.

Sources
Dutch Wikipedia Article
Biography of Taco Mesdag at the Webmuseum Mesdagvancalcar
Bryan, Michael: Dictionary of Painters and Engravers

1829 births
1902 deaths
19th-century Dutch painters
Dutch male painters
Hague School
Painters from Groningen
19th-century Dutch male artists